Ryde Academy is an academy status secondary school, including sixth form, located in Ryde on the Isle of Wight, England.

History
Education on the school site began with Ryde High School which was a 13–18 school built and opened in 1964 to accommodate the expanding population of Ryde, the largest town on the Isle of Wight. The school was successful in achieving a Specialist Languages Status and a Media and Arts Specialism. In 2008 the Isle of Wight education authority decided to abolish the tripartite education system (of First schools, Middle Schools and High Schools) and instead adopt the two stage, Primary School and Secondary school model used by the majority of authorities in England. According to the new two stage model Ryde High School would be extended from the 712 pupils of 13–18 age range, and it would become an Academy for 1200 pupils aged 11–18.

Academy chains were invited to bid for the contract to run the new Ryde Academy 11–18 school. The contract was won by Academies Enterprise Trust which took over Ryde Academy (and also two other schools on the Isle of Wight: Sandown Bay Academy and Weston Academy) in 2012.

In 2014, Ryde Academy was successful in acquiring the site of a local primary school which was closing, and this became the new Haylands Sixth Form Centre.

The last headteacher of Ryde High School was Linda McGowan. The first Principal of Ryde Academy was Rob Hoddle who resigned in 2013. He was replaced by the Vice Principal, Debbie Price, who became acting Principal in Nov 2013 until a new principal could be appointed. Dr Rory Fox was appointed as Executive Principal to provide external support to Mrs Price. Eric Jackson took over leadership of the Academy in January 2015, and Joy Ballard was appointed as Principal for September 2015.

Academic achievements
In 2007 Ryde High School was commended by the Department for Education (called DfES at the time) for its achievements with disadvantaged pupils. In 2010, before Ryde High School became Ryde Academy, it was judged by OFSTED to be providing a "Satisfactory" quality of education. In its first inspection as an Academies Enterprise Trust (AET) school, OFSTED judged that standards were "inadequate".

GCSE results since 2004 have improved as follows:

In the summer of 2014 Ryde Academy reported its biggest ever improvement in results, with a 200% improvement in the proportion of pupils gaining A/A* grades In the Summer of 2015, when AET asked Eric Jackson (from AET's "troubled" Sandown Bay Academy) to lead Ryde Academy, the GCSE results plummeted to 36% (compared to Carisbrooke College 53% and Priory School 54%).

A level results have gone from 3% of pupils gaining A/A* results in 2010, to 50% of pupils gaining A/A* in 2016.

In terms of its OFSTED grades, the academy has improved steadily from "inadequate" in 2013 to "requires improvement" in 2014, to "good" in Nov 2016. The leader of the Isle of Wight Council, Jonathan Bacon, said: "This is great news...I have no doubt that the school will continue to build upon this achievement..." Principal, Joy Ballard, said: "I'm fed up reading about what a bad deal the island's education system seems to be giving to its kids."

Extra curricular and community achievements
Rock Challenge: the academy competes each year and in 2013 won the Southern Premier competition. In 2015 Ryde Academy came second in the national finals.
Young Enterprise Challenge. The Ryde High School team won the 2010 Isle of Wight finals.
National Citizen Service events, including in 2016 a residential event at Marwell Zoo, followed by a second week at PGL Little Canada. as well as hosting tea parties for local residential care homes at the Sixth Form Centre.
International links: in February 2011, Ryde High were the first school in the country to send students to Bangladesh on a trip. The students went as part of the Connecting Classrooms project and visited five schools around the country.
Financial Management: Prior to joining the Academies Enterprise Trust Ryde High School was suffering from a significant deficit in the region of £1m. but by 2015 the academy had managed to reverse that situation, into a surplus of more than £1m.

Controversies
In 2014 there was a crackdown on school uniform which led to an estimated 250 to 300 pupils being removed from lessons and sent home or placed in isolation, due to uniform infringements. which included issues with skirt length, shoes and socks, and trousers. Some pupils were sent home and some were placed in Isolation and the incident received widespread coverage from BBC South Today, The Times, The Telegraph and the Loose Women television show. As a result of the Academy's action's some parents removed their children from the school and Academies Enterprise Trust said that they fully supported Ryde Academy.

In 2014 a controversy erupted when teaching unions at Ryde academy were challenged for defending poorly performing teachers who were accused of letting down the education of the children within the academy. Matters came to a head in Feb 2015 when under-performing union members were due to be dismissed, but Ian Comfort, the CEO of Academies Enterprise Trust intervened to prevent that from taking place.

In Jan 2015 OFSTED criticized the Academies Enterprise Trust for failing to provide enough support to Ryde Academy in order to help the academy to improve standards at a faster rate. When academic standards at neighboring Sandown Bay Academy collapsed and Academies Enterprise Trust were unable to improve the school, they announced in 2017 a plan to close Sandown Bay Academy and the transfer of all the pupils to Ryde Academy. The principal and governors of Ryde announced that they had not even been consulted about the plan and that they had discovered it from AET's press statements. There were widespread protests across the Isle of Wight about the poor performance of AET and the way that AET were behaving with the Island's schools, leading to a demand that AET should be removed from managing all schools on the Isle of Wight, including Ryde Academy.

Notable former pupils and staff

 Kelly Sotherton – English heptathlete
Razzle (musician) - drummer of Finnish glam rock band Hanoi Rocks

External links

References 

Academies on the Isle of Wight
Secondary schools on the Isle of Wight
Academies Enterprise Trust
Ryde
2011 establishments in England